Mbogi is a ward in Tarime District, Mara Region of northern Tanzania, East Africa. In 2016 the Tanzania National Bureau of Statistics report there were 8,964 people in the ward, from 8,124 in 2012.

Villages / neighborhoods 
The ward has 3 villages and 19 hamlets.

 Nyabitocho
 Getaigoro
 Gokebose
 Mbogi
 Nyabinembu
 Nyabitocho
 Stend
 Borega "B"
 Borega Senta
 Kenyabwegenye
 Kogaini
 Kubiritoho
 Mugoyega
 Renyamwarya
 Getenga
 Getenga
 Kebeyo
 Kitagutiti
 Masurura
 Nyamemba
 Nyarogatai
 Rooko

References

Tarime District
Mara Region